Icelandic turf houses were the product of a difficult climate, offering superior insulation compared to buildings solely made of wood or stone, and the relative difficulty in obtaining other construction materials in sufficient quantities.

30% of Iceland was forested when it was settled, mostly with birch. Oak was the preferred timber for building Norse halls in Scandinavia, but native birch had to serve as the primary framing material on the remote island. However, Iceland did have a large amount of turf that was suitable for construction. Some structures in Norway had turf roofs, so the notion of using this as a building material was not alien to many settlers.

Construction

The common Icelandic turf house would have a large foundation made of flat stones; upon this was built a wooden frame which would hold the load of the turf. The turf would then be fitted around the frame in blocks, often with a second layer, or in the more fashionable herringbone pattern. 

The only external wood would be the doorway which would often be decorative; the doorway would lead into the hall which would commonly have a great fire. The floor of a turf house could be covered with wood, stone or earth depending on the purpose of the building.
They also contain grass on their roofs.

Evolution

Icelandic architecture changed in many ways in  more than 1,000 years after the turf  houses were being constructed. The first evolutionary step happened in the 14th century, when the Viking-style longhouses were gradually abandoned and replaced with many small and specialized interconnected buildings. Then in the late 18th century a new style started to gain momentum, the burstabær, with its wooden ends or gaflar. This is the most commonly depicted version of the Icelandic turf houses and many such survived well into the 20th century. This style was then slowly replaced with the urban building style of wooden house clothed in corrugated iron, which in turn was replaced with the earthquake-resistant reinforced concrete building.

See also

Sod house
Earth lodge

References

Houses in Iceland
Sod houses
House styles
Scandinavian architecture
Semi-subterranean structures